The  Legionäre are a baseball and softball club from Regensburg, Bavaria.  The team is also known as Buchbinder Legionäre, following a sponsorship deal with German car rental company Buchbinder Autovermietung ("Buchbinder Car Rental").

Founded in 1987, the first men's team plays in the first division of the Baseball Bundesliga. In the 2010 season, Legionäre led the Southern Division in most offensive and defensive categories, posting a combined .367 batting average and hitting 21 home runs as a team, while the club's pitching staff posted a 2.21 ERA.

Club structure
The full club consists of 11 teams:
1st Men's Baseball, plays in Bundesliga's 1st Division
2nd Men's Baseball
Bavarian League Softball
Bavarian League Baseball
District League Baseball
Bayern Youth League
Youth National League
Student Livepitching
Student Tossball
T-Ball 
Softball, U15

As part of a fund raising effort, Legionäre began selling stock in the club at the price of €100 a share, equating to €1 of the team value.  The shares are not marketed as high-return investments but contributions that give the supporter a presence in the organization.

Season by season performance (1st Bundesliga)

Euro League Baseball
Buchbinder Legionäre Regensburg was one of the three teams to start in the inaugural season of the Euro League Baseball.

References

External links
Official Site

Baseball teams in Germany
Sport in Regensburg